Sarah Main is an Australian-born DJ working in Ibiza, most prominently associated with the club Pacha. She appeared as herself in the film It's All Gone Pete Tong. Apart from her regular Ibiza appearances, Main has DJ internationally at many clubs in Europe.

References

External links
 

 
 Interview with In The Mix
 How to DJ with Sarah Main, Phil K & James Zabiela
 Sarah Main relationship with Pacha Ibiza

20th-century births
20th-century Australian musicians
21st-century Australian musicians
Australian DJs
Australian expatriates in Spain
Australian house musicians
Australian record producers
Club DJs
Women DJs
Living people
Musicians from Sydney
Remixers
Year of birth missing (living people)
20th-century women musicians
Electronic dance music DJs
21st-century women musicians
Australian women record producers